The Courtesy Freight Northern Ontario Superspiel was an annual bonspiel, or curling tournament, that was held annually in November at the Port Arthur Curling Club in Thunder Bay, Ontario. The tournament was one of the development series events introduced on the World Curling Tour during the 2012–13 curling season. The tournament was held in a round robin format. The tournament started in 2012 as part of the World Curling Tour, but was held earlier as an Ontario Curling Tour Event. It was discontinued after 2013. 

A women's event existed for just one season, in 2012.

Past champions
Only skip's name is displayed.

Men

Women

External links
Port Arthur Curling Club website

References

Former World Curling Tour events
Sport in Thunder Bay
Ontario Curling Tour events
Curling competitions in Canada